This is a list of sports venues in South Korea.

General stadia 
These stadia are used for various sports.

 Bucheon Stadium
 Busan Asiad Stadium, in Busan
 Changwon Civic Stadium
 Cheonan Baekseok Stadium
 Chuncheon Civic Stadium, in Chuncheon, Gangwon-do
 Daegu Stadium
 Dongcheon Arena, in Ulsan
 Duryu Park Stadium
 Gangneung Stadium, in Gangneung, Gangwon-do
 Gimcheon Stadium
 Gimhae Stadium, in Gimhae, Gyeongsangnam-do
 Goyang Stadium
 Gwang-Yang Stadium
 Gwangju City Public Stadium, in Gwangju, Gyeonggi-do
 Hanbat Stadium, in Daejeon
 Incheon Civic Stadium, in Incheon
 Jamsil Arena, in Seoul
 Jangchung Gymnasium, in Seoul
 Jecheon Stadium, in Jecheon, Chungcheongbuk-do
 Jeju Stadium, in Jeju City, Jeju-do
 Jeju World Cup Stadium
 Jeonju Stadium
 Masan Stadium, in Masan, Gyeongsangnam-do
 Munsu Cup Stadium
 Olympic Stadium, in Seoul
 Opo Public Stadium, in Gwangju, Gyeonggi-do
 Paju Public Stadium, in Paju
 Shilchon Public Stadium, in Gwangju, Gyeonggi-do
 Sajik Arena, in Busan
 Sangju Civic Stadium
 Seongnam 2 Stadium
 Seoul World Cup Stadium
 Steelyard Stadium
 Suwon Civic Stadium
 Suwon World Cup Stadium
 Toichon Public Stadium, in Gwangju, Gyeonggi-do
 Uijeongbu Stadium, in Uijeongbu, Gyeonggi-do

Football venues

Baseball venues

Gymnastics venues 
These are venues which are dedicated exclusively to gymnastics.
 Olympic Gymnastics Arena

Tennis venues 
These are venues which are dedicated exclusively to tennis.
 Seoul Olympic Park Tennis Center

See also 
 Sport in South Korea
 List of Asian stadiums by capacity

 
Venues
Sports venues
South Korea